Tecate Pa'l Norte is a music, art, and norteño tradition festival held every year since 2012 in Monterrey, Nuevo León. The event reunites the best of Latin America's dedicated talent. Pa'l Norte is counted among the most popular festivals within Latin America and within the top 3 with most earnings in Mexico. As of today, it counts as the weekend with the highest economic impact in the state of Nuevo León, making it a business hit for the tourism industry (hotels, restaurants, nightlife, local tourism and transportation).

The event is organized by Apodaca Music Group, highly regarded artist managers and creators of festivals and events such as: Live Out Monterrey, Rock N' Picnic, Fusión Ska, Friday Social Scene, Tough Mudder (Mexican partners), etcetera.

Pa'l Norte's stages have showcased important artists, bands and DJs of national and international fame, plus endorses emerging talents. To name a few of the renown talents the festival has brought: Snoop Dogg, 50 Cent, Robin Schulz, Two Door Cinema Club, Enrique Bunbury, Los Fabulosos Cadillacs, Caifanes, Foster The People, Café Tacuba, Los Auténticos Decadentes, Zoé, Kinky, Plastilina Mosh, Calle 13, Los Amigos Invisibles, Julieta Venegas, Los Claxons, Panda, La Ley, Tigres del Norte, Intocable, Jumbo, Juanes, and many more.

Pa'l Norte is recognized by an iconic lion that each year changes its design, color and style, matching with the festival's slogan "Siempre Ascendente" (Always Rising). This catchphrase was taken from the home state of Nuevo León's heraldry, and it's a philosophy the festival holds in improving year after year.

History 
During much of 2012, Monterrey was brought to a stop due to major security issues around the city, and a festival with this kind of frequency and repercussions was non-existent. Based on the previous statements, Apodaca Music Group creates Pa'l Norte, inspired by pride and traditions of Northern Mexico held within an event that offers a unique experience for two successive days of live music with spectacular stages and diverse activities, such as: food trucks, Mercadito Pa'l Norte (marketplace), kermesse, official merchandise store, live bar (regional music) and more.

Starting with the 2013 edition, it incorporates Pa'l Mercado, a small marketplace that powers local products and entrepreneurs. This year also sees the creation of the "Surprise stage", where surprise artists make an appearance. This stage was opened up by La Ley.

2015 broke a record in economical outburst and hotel rooming of any month of April in the history of Monterrey, stated by the Secretariat of Tourism, leaving an economical impact of over 125 million pesos in Monterrey, Nuevo León.

Past editions

Pa’l Norte Rock Festival 2012 

On November 24, 2012, Pa'l Norte was held for the first time in Diego Rivera Park under the name "Pa'l Norte Rock Festival". The event lasted for 13 consecutive hours, and showcased 16 artists in two stages. The event welcomed 37,000 attendees from the states of Tamaulipas, Durango and Coahuila. Besides offering a varied musical repertoire for the local audience, it dedicated a spot to selling regional food like cabrito and attractions like a mechanical bull. Doors to the event opened at 12:00, with the first artist programmed to start at 13:30.

Patricia González Aguirre, head of Corporate Tourism Development commented that Pa'l Norte Rock Festival "increased hotel occupation 11%, and exclusively in the Valle neighbourhood registered a 73% occupation, against the usual 58%".

Line Up 2012

Official sponsors: Indio, Winston, Coca-Cola, Telcel, Red Bull, Jack Daniels.

Pa’l Norte Music Fest 2013 

For a second time in 2013, Pa’l Norte was held under the name "Pa’l Norte Music Fest". This one-day event had the participation of 37 bands, on November 9, with an occupation of 53,000 people in Diego Rivera Park. The event carried controversy behind it, because the municipality of San Pedro (where the Park is located) wouldn't budge on the permits necessary for making it possible. Finally, a month before the event has held, they were denied the permit, which forced the organizers to look for another venue: Parque Fundidora, having more space an security than what was planned before. The festival had two stages Unión Indio and Indio, and also an alternative tent for electronic music with capacity for 6,000 people; additionally a surprise stage between the main stages where La Leyenda presented themselves.

From this edition onwards, Pa’l Norte starts using a video where it integrates the line-up in different situations and themes, and it also starts collaborating with local graffiti poetry-artist Movimiento Acción Poética for the festival's street publicity around the city.

The event used a sophisticated illumination system and spectacular stages, including the Sidney Tent, that had been used only twice in the country for events in Cancún.

2013's official sponsors were Indio, Coca-Cola Zero, Telcel, Nuevo León's Tourism board, Red Bull, Marlboro, and Herradura Tequila.

Line Up 2013 
For its second anniversary, main guests were: Julieta Venegas, Café Tacvba, Babasonicos, Kinky, Pxndx, Los Claxons, INNA, Fobia, Natalia Lafourcade, Porter, Ximena Sariñana, Genitallica, Hello Seahorse!, Románticos de Zacatecas, Division Minúscula, Resorte and Miami Miami.

Coca-Cola Zero Club

Besides the main stages, the festival included an electronic tent with talents such as: Lance Herbstrong, DJ Lukas, DJ Agustin, Daniella, DJ Set, Fee Caballero, Radio Rebelde, Morenito de Fuego, Dberrie.

Pa’l Norte Fest 2014 
From 2014 onwards, Pa’l Norte starts its two-day run, celebrating on the 31st of October and the 1st of November in Parque Fundidora. Doors opened at 3p.m. and the event started at 4p.m. Attendees for the event were around the 104,000 figure for the combination of both days (41,000 on Friday, and 63,000 on Saturday), and was the first year that included international talents. Pa’l Norte 2014 included two main stages (Tecate Light and Indio) and the Coca-Cola Zero Club tent for electronic music. For those unable to go to the festival, it was transmitted on the web through INDIO TV for those out of the state.

The first day of the festival had over 10 hours of continuous music, and after a fireworks show, Los Tigres del Norte closed the festival's first night. The festival also included its now traditional surprise stage with guests Vanilla Ice, Chingy, Proyecto Uno and Inner Circle.

Due to the date the festival was being held on, it also included a Halloween costume contest with a prize of 100,000 pesos. The contest was held on the third stage, proposed for alternative bands this year, and it included a stand where attendees could get a zombie make-over. Besides this, the festival incorporated Pa’l Mercado, a regional artisan and local product fair, and a more extensive Food Court with a variety of food and drinks.

Official sponsors: Tecate, Turismo de NL, Telcel, Coca-Cola, Lucky Strike, Launch, Diesel, Red Bull, Claro Musica. Michemix and Diageo.

Line Up 2014

Foster The People, Snoop Dogg, Allison, Kinky, Zoé, El Gran Silencio, Enrique Bunbury, Molotov, Control Machete, Enjambre, Zurdok, Band of Bitches, Chromeo DJ, Plastilina Mosh, Los Amigos invisibles, Tigres del Norte, Reyno, La Ley, Jumbo, Juanes, AFI, De la Tierra, Daniella Spalla, Andrés Calamaro, Vetusta Morla, Juanes, Thecnicolor Fabrics, DLD, Maria Daniela y sus amigos Laser.

Pa’l Norte 2015 
On April 24 and 25th Pal Norte is held for the fourth time, and again in Parque Fundidora in the city of Monterrey. Again with a two-day run, it reunited 114,000 attended (44,000 on the first day, 70,000 on the second). It had special surprise guests Village People and Intocable as closing acts. For this event, besides the usual public from local states, attendees travelled from border towns in the US, and Colombia, Guatemala and El Salvador.

For this edition, Pal Norte had 5 stages: Tecate, Indio, Ascendente (for alternative and rising stars), Surprise, Regional. The main blocks that conform the festival fromprevious years also included: Food Court, Pa’l Mercado, Carpa Ascendente, and EMS as a precaution for the general public. Thanks to a special partnership, the city's metro lines extended their working hours to give service to the attendees. Surprise stage guests this year were Coolio, Crazy Town, Village People and Big Boy.

Line Up 2015

2015's edition included acts by Garbage, Imagine Dragons, 2 Live Crew, 311, Café Tacvba, Calle 13, The Kooks, Intocable, Molotov, Flo Rida, Aterciopelados, The Beatles, Ximena Sariñana, Enanitos Verdes, Galatzia, Shirley Manson, Babasónicos, Belanova, Corazón Attack, Maná, Los Claxons, Disco Ruido, Clibz, Calonchos, Botellita de Jerez, Nortec Colletive: Bostich + Fussible, Los Infiernos, No te Va a Gustar, Apolo, Juan Cirerol, Gondwana, The Warning and Los Daniels.

Pa’l Norte 2016 

Pa’l Norte festival 2016 took place on April 15 and 16th in Parque Fundidora, with the participation of national and international artists in six stages: Tecate, Indio, Ascendente, Sorpresa, Regional, and newly added Club Social for electronic indie DJs with amazing visuals and sound.

2016 attendees were recorded as high as 134,000 people: on both nights of the festival.

Line Up 2016

The edition of Pa’l Norte included the following guests: 50 Cent, Caifanes, Enrique Bunbury, Carla Morrison, Felix Jaehn, Mœnia, Marky Ramone, Los Pericos, Los Fabulosos Cadillacs, Los Pericos, Jenny and The Mexicats, Hello Seahorse!, J Balvin, Leon Larregui, Los Autenticos Decadentes, Los Concorde, Natalia Lafourcade, Naughty by Nature, The Wailers, Plastilina Mosh, Porter, Robin Schulz, Rock en tu Idioma, Siddharta, Sussie 4 and Two Door Cinema Club.

Pa’l Norte 2017 

Line Up 2017

This year's edition included the following artists: The Killers, Maná, Placebo, Kaskade, M.I.A, The Offspring, Nicolas Jaar, Jason Derulo, Enanitos Verdes, Fito Paéz, Jarabe de Palo, Sigala, Los Caligaris, Mon Laferte, El Gran Silencio, Los Amigos Invisibles, Fidel Nadal, Dread Mar I, Cartel de Santa, Matt & Kim, Draco Rosa, MXPX, Mike Posner, Drake Bell, MOTEL, La Beriso, Los Daniels, Diamante Eléctrico, She's a Tease, Los Rumberos de Massachusetts, Buffalo Blanco, Cony la Tuquera, La Gusana Ciega, Carlos Sadness, REYNO, Lost Kings, Shaun Frank, Elephante, Lee Foss, Party Favor, Dr. Fresch, Toy Selectah, Sita Abellán, Daniel Maloso, Jessica Audiffred, Chordashian, Cazzel & Geru, No somos machos pero somos muchos, La Tostadora, Pato GQ, AIAS, Mejia, Wet Babes, Fleurs Du Mal, Morality.

2017 again broke attendance records with his figures of 170,000 people on both days of the festival.

Pa’l Norte 2018 

Line Up 2018

This year's edition included the following artists: Muse, Queens of Stone Age, Zoé, Bunbury, Justice, Franz Ferdinand, Richard Ashcroft, Molotov, Los Autenticos Decadentes, Fobia, Panteon Rococo, Natalia Lafourcade, Morat, Band of Horses, Don Diablo, Cheat Codes, Farruko, DLD, Enjambre, Sebastian Yatra, División Minúscula, Gondwana, El Gran Silencio, Nothing but Thieves, Miranda!, Bersuit Vergarabat, Mike Perry, Gryffin, Autograf, Camilo VII, Monsieur Perine, Zona Ganjah, Jillionare, SNBRN, Rey Pila, Jonaz, Costera, Pate de Fua, Elsa y Elmar, Volovan, The Knocks, Lauren Lane, La Vida Boheme, Izal, Sabino, Ghetto Kids, Win & Woo, MADDS, Future Feelings, Gil Montiel, Chelsea Leyland, Ilse Hendrix, Lujavo, Fancy Folks, Ambroz, Israel Torres, Marcelo Gamboa, MAWBB, BRONCOWAVE, Nurrydog, Leon Leiden, Armi Diamonds, The Last Internationale, Los de Abajo, Comisario Pantera and more.

Pa’l Norte 2019 

Line Up 2019

This year's edition included the following artists: Arctic Monkeys, Kings of Leon, Santana, The 1975, A Day To Remember, Alan Walker, Cafe Tacvba, Caligaris, Good Charlote, Hombres G & Enanitos Verdes, The Hives, Nicky Jam, Residente, Snow Patrol, 3LAU, Aleman, Allison, Bengala, Charles Ans, Cuarteto de Nos, Damian Lazarus, Dread Mar I, George Fitzgerald, GTA, Guy Gerber, Inspector, Jonas Blue, Karol G, Kungs, Lany, Little Jesus, Nach, Odisseo, Pete Tong, Porter, Reyno, Rock en tu Idioma, Sinfonico II, Samantha Ronson, Serbia, Siddartha, La Sonora Dinamita, Titan, Tokyo Ska Paradise Orchestra, The Wookies, Ximena Sariñana, Afrobrothers, Los Blenders, Camel Power Club, Centavrus, La Garfield, Juan Pablo Vega, Los Mesoneros, Midnight Generation, Primavera Club, Tessa IA, The Zombie Kids and more.

Surprise: Cristian Castro, Los Tucanes de Tijuana, Manuel Turizo, Chichi Peralta.

Pa’l Norte 2021

Next event 

The latest edition will be on March 31, April 1 and 02 of 2023.

Location 
Parque Fundidora, located in grounds that used to be owned by Fundidora de Fierro y Acero de Monterrey, in coordinates 25°40′41″N 100°17′00″O. It has access through Madero avenue and Fundidora, and is connected to the Macroplaza through Paseo Santa Lucía lateral to two metro stations: Parque Fundidora and Y Griega. Another music festival that is hosted in this location is the Machaca Fest in the summer season.

Attendance and event success 
Within the last four years the event has been made, and the historical attendance of 114,000 people, Pa’l Norte 2016 is expected to reach 120,000 attendees and become the most successful festival in Mexico and Latin America.

Tourism 
Patricio González Aguirre, head of Corporate Tourism Development commented that Pa'l Norte 2012 "increased hotel occupation 11%, and exclusively in the Valle neighbourhood registered a 73% occupation, against the usual 58%".

In 2015, the festival broke the record for any April in the city's history in an economic growth of over 125 million pesos, note given by the Tourism Secretariat.

Tours and collaborations 
For the artists involved, Pa’l Norte has become an important event in which to exhibit themselves and reach their audience, making it a starting point for many of their tours. This event gives them the space for interesting collaborations, who wouldn't normally coincide onstage.

References 
 
 
 
 
 
 
 
 
 
 
 
 
 
 
 
 
 
 
 
 
 
 
 
 
 
 
 
 
 
 

Arts festivals in Mexico
Music festivals in Mexico
Spring (season) events in Mexico